This is a list of topics around Boolean algebra and propositional logic.

Articles with a wide scope and introductions 

 Algebra of sets  
 Boolean algebra (structure)  
 Boolean algebra  
 Field of sets  
 Logical connective   
 Propositional calculus

Boolean functions and connectives

 Ampheck  
 Analysis of Boolean functions  
 Balanced boolean function  
 Bent function  
 Boolean algebras canonically defined  
 Boolean function  
 Boolean matrix  
 Boolean-valued function  
 Conditioned disjunction  
 Evasive Boolean function  
 Exclusive or  
 Functional completeness  
 Logical biconditional  
 Logical conjunction  
 Logical disjunction  
 Logical equality  
 Logical implication  
 Logical negation  
 Logical NOR  
 Lupanov representation  
 Majority function  
 Material conditional  
 Minimal axioms for Boolean algebra
 Peirce arrow  
 Read-once function  
 Sheffer stroke  
 Sole sufficient operator  
 Symmetric Boolean function  
 Symmetric difference  
 Zhegalkin polynomial

Examples of Boolean algebras 

 Boolean domain  
 Complete Boolean algebra  
 Interior algebra  
 Two-element Boolean algebra

Extensions of Boolean algebras 

 Derivative algebra (abstract algebra)  
 Free Boolean algebra  
 Monadic Boolean algebra

Generalizations of Boolean algebras 

 De Morgan algebra  
 First-order logic  
 Heyting algebra  
 Lindenbaum–Tarski algebra  
 Skew Boolean algebra

Syntax 

 Algebraic normal form  
 Boolean conjunctive query  
 Canonical form (Boolean algebra)  
 Conjunctive normal form  
 Disjunctive normal form  
 Formal system

Technical applications 

 And-inverter graph  
 Logic gate  
 Boolean analysis

Theorems and specific laws 

 Boolean prime ideal theorem  
 Compactness theorem  
 Consensus theorem  
 De Morgan's laws  
 Duality (order theory)  
 Laws of classical logic  
 Peirce's law  
 Stone's representation theorem for Boolean algebras

People 

 Boole, George  
 De Morgan, Augustus  
 Jevons, William Stanley  
 Peirce, Charles Sanders  
 Stone, Marshall Harvey  
 Venn, John  
 Zhegalkin, Ivan Ivanovich

Philosophy 

 Boole's syllogistic  
 Boolean implicant  
 Entitative graph  
 Existential graph  
 Laws of Form  
 Logical graph

Visualization 

 Truth table  
 Karnaugh map  
 Venn diagram

Unclassified

 Boolean function  
 Boolean-valued function  
 Boolean-valued model  
 Boolean satisfiability problem  
 Boolean differential calculus
 Indicator function   (also called the characteristic function, but that term is used in probability theory for a different concept)
 Espresso heuristic logic minimizer
 Logical matrix  
 Logical value  
 Stone duality  
 Stone space
 Topological Boolean algebra  

Boolean algebra
 
Boolean algebra
Boolean algebra